Banu Avar (born 18 July 1955, Eskişehir) is a Turkish author, journalist, news anchor, and political commentator. She started her career at the Turkish magazine Süreç in 1980, and has worked in newspapers such as Günaydin, Dünya, and Vatan.

After getting her master's degree at City University, London, she worked at the BBC as a radio reporter for the Turkish news department and trained with the BBC documentary department. She was hired by Turkish Radio and Television Corporation (TRT) in London. A short time later, she became a reporter for the popular TV programme 32.  Since 1985 she has worked as a producer. In 1999, she created two programmes for TRT. She has also made documentaries for the Discovery Channel and the BBC.

In 1999, she started documentaries with TV8 and worked there as a director until 2004. After leaving that job, she transferred to TRT 1 and started producing documentaries for them, beginning with Sinirlar Arasinda. So far, more than 20 such documentaries have appeared on TV. She has also presented an anti-capitalist programme for TRT 1.

Countries which have shown her work include France, the Netherlands, Israel, Palestine, Uzbekistan, Iran, Algeria, Denmark, and the U.K. She has become more critical of Turkey and other European countries.

Awards
 Turkish Writers Union, Television Programmer of the Year Award. 2005
 TÜRKSAV Service Award 2005
 Contemporary Journalists Association 2006 Award for Television News
 Akdeniz University, Atatürk's Principles and Revolution History Research and Application Center "Kemalist thought contributors Award" 2006–2007
 Istanbul Kultur University Faculty of Art and Design "Yürekli Women Award" (2006)
 Yeditepe University honorary doctorate from Banu Avar 20 April 2007

Filmography
 Deniz (1999)
 Hayatım Müzik (Mayıs 1999-Ocak 2000)
 Önemli müzik adamlarının yaşam öyküleri( 15 Bölüm )
 Depremle Yaşamak (2000) ( 10 Bölüm )
 Unutulan Yıllar (2000)
 Denizciler Belgeseli (2000–2001)
 Deniz kuvvetleri Komutanlığı desteğiyle Türkiye’nin denizcilik tarihi
 Deniz Kuvvetleri, Deniz Ticareti ve Deniz Sporunun tarihi ve bugünü ( 9 Bölüm )
 Türkiye Sevdalıları (2000–2001)
 Afghanistan : Devlerin Savaş Alanı (2002)
 Ohri Ohri Güzel Ohri (2002)
 Artık Biz De Varız (2002)
 Atletin Adı : Süreyya (2002)
 Bir Zamanlar Kıbrıs'ta (2003)
 Unutulan Yıllar (2003)
 Kafkaslarda Politik Bir Satranç Ustası : Rıza Oğlu Haydar Aliyev (2004)
 Sınırlar Arasında (2004–2008)

Books
 Sınırlar Arasında – Hüznün Toprağı Balkanlar'dan Geleceğin Gücü Avrasya'ya
 Avrasyalı Olmak
 Hangi Avrupa?
 Böl ve Yut
 Hangi Dünya Düzeni

References

External links
 official website (in Turkish)

1955 births
Turkish writers
Turkish journalists
Living people
Turkish expatriates in the United Kingdom
Turkish people of Avar descent
People from Eskişehir